Metz Dam is an earth-fill type dam located on the Moetladimo River, near Trichardsdal, Limpopo [opposite  Sekororo Hospital ], South Africa. The dam serves mainly for domestic supply, stock watering and irrigation and its hazard potential has been ranked significant (2).

See also
List of reservoirs and dams in South Africa
List of rivers of South Africa

References 

 List of South African Dams from the Department of Water Affairs

Dams in South Africa